Tapiphyllum was a genus of flowering plants in the family Rubiaceae but is no longer recognized. In 2005, a molecular phylogenetic study showed that the type species, Tapiphyllum cinerascens, is more closely related to Vangueria than to Tapiphyllum obtusifolium and Tapiphyllum velutinum. It is not clear whether the latter two species are really separate from Vangueria. All the species of Tapiphyllum have been sunk into synonymy with Vangueria.

References

External links
 World Checklist of Rubiaceae

Historically recognized Rubiaceae genera
Vanguerieae
Taxonomy articles created by Polbot